Rouville Beaudry (August 26, 1904 – May 14, 1997) was a Canadian politician active in Quebec. He was a Member of the Legislative Assembly of Quebec (MLA).

Career

Born in Magog, Estrie, Beaudry ran as an Action libérale nationale candidate in the provincial district of Stanstead in the 1935 provincial election and won against Liberal incumbent Alfred-Joseph Bissonet.  He joined Maurice Duplessis's Union Nationale and was re-elected in the 1936 election.  Beaudry resigned and left provincial politics in 1938.

He served as a city councillor in Magog from 1944 to 1948.

References

1904 births
1997 deaths
Action libérale nationale MNAs
People from Magog, Quebec
Union Nationale (Quebec) MNAs